Zhang Guoqing (born August 1964) is a Chinese politician and former corporate executive who has served as vice premier of the People's Republic of China since March 2023 and a member of the Politburo of the Chinese Communist Party since October 2022. Previously, he served as the mayor of Tianjin, one of the four direct-controlled municipalities of China. An economics doctorate from Tsinghua University, Zhang had previously served as the Communist Party secretary of Liaoning, mayor of Chongqing, the chief executive of North Industries, a military contractor.

Early life 
Zhang was born in 1964 in the town of Lingshan, Luoshan County, Henan province. He studied electrical engineering at the Changchun Institute of Optical Mechanics (now Changchun University of Science and Technology) and graduated in 1985. After graduating, he pursued a master's degree from the Nanjing University of Science and Technology in international trade.

Corporate career 
Zhang worked at Norinco, a military supplier. He began work as a project manager, then worked in the company's operations in the Middle East, including a stint in the company's office in Tehran.  He was promoted to Vice President in 1996, and by 1998, he had become the Communist Party Secretary of the company, first-in-charge. He also became Chairman of the Board of China Wanbao Engineering Ltd. In 1999, Zhang began work for the China North Industries Group Corporation as a Vice-President. By April 2004 he was promoted to chief executive of North Industries. During this time he also earned a doctorate in economics from Tsinghua University. Between September and November 2001 he took part in an executive management course at Harvard Business School.

Political career 
In 2007, Zhang was named an alternate member of the 17th Central Committee of the Chinese Communist Party, and was one of the youngest members with a seat on the body (he was only 42 at the time). By 2012, China North Industries had secured a place in the Fortune Global 500. In 2012, he became a full member of the 18th Central Committee. 

In April 2013, Zhang took on a political office for the first time in his life, and was named deputy party chief of Chongqing; three months later he also took on the role of president of the Chongqing party school, which is customary for deputy party chiefs of a jurisdiction. Along with Ma Xingrui, Zhang was the only provincial-level deputy party chief with a full seat on the 18th Central Committee. In December 2016, Zhang was appointed the acting mayor of Chongqing. 

In December 2017, Zhang was appointed as the CPC Deputy Secretary of Tianjin. Later, he was appointed as Mayor in January 2018.

On September 1, 2020, Zhang was appointed as the CPC Secretary of Liaoning.

Zhang is seen as a promising candidate for the "6th generation of Chinese leadership". Compared to his contemporaries, Zhang's background is unusual in that much of his career was spent as a corporate executive rather than in politics.

After the 20th Party National Congress, he was elected as a member of the CCP Politburo. On 12 March 2023, he was appointed as a vice premier of the People's Republic of China.

References 

1964 births
Living people
People from Xinyang
Changchun University of Science and Technology alumni
Nanjing University of Science and Technology alumni
Mayors of Tianjin
Mayors of Chongqing
People's Republic of China politicians from Henan
Chinese Communist Party politicians from Henan
Harvard Business School alumni
Tsinghua University alumni
Alternate members of the 17th Central Committee of the Chinese Communist Party
Members of the 18th Central Committee of the Chinese Communist Party
Members of the 19th Central Committee of the Chinese Communist Party
Members of the 20th Politburo of the Chinese Communist Party
Vice Premiers of the People's Republic of China